Ralph P. Hummel (August 9, 1937 – March 20, 2012) was a professor of public administration at the University of Akron and a founding fellow of the Institute of Applied Phenomenology in Science and Technology.  He is best known for his book The Bureaucratic Experience.

Education and career 

Hummel graduated from Wayne State University, where he worked for The Daily Collegian. He worked as a reporter and editor for The New York Times and The Washington Post, among other papers. He received his Ph.D. in political science from New York University in 1972.  His Ph.D. thesis examined the concept of charisma in the works of Max Weber.

He taught at Fordham University, State University of New York at Fredonia, John Jay College of Criminal Justice, New York University, Brooklyn College, and the University of Oklahoma.  After 10 years as a professor at the University of Akron in the Department of Public Administration and Urban Studies, he retired in 2008 and became professor emeritus.

The Bureaucratic Experience
Hummel's most famous work was the book The Bureaucratic Experience which went through five editions (1977, 1982, 1987, 1994, and 2008). The book contends that bureaucracy is dehumanizing; for example, it deals with cases instead of people, and it focuses on efficiency at the expense of other human values.
Hummel also wrote The Real American Politics: Changing Perspectives on American Government (Jan 1986) and Politics for Human Beings with Robert A. Isaak (1975)

Personal life
Hummel was born in Karlsruhe, Germany, on August 9, 1937, emigrated to Canada and eventually to the United States in 1951.  He was married to Camilla Stivers, a professor of public administration.  He died in Rockport, Maine on March 20, 2012.

Selected publications

References

American political scientists
New York University alumni
Public administration scholars
University of Akron faculty
1937 births
2012 deaths
Brooklyn College faculty